Voters in 26 of Washington's 49 legislative districts voted for their state senators in the 2008 Washington State Senate elections on November 4, 2008. All vote totals are from the Washington Secretary of State's website.

25 seats were regularly scheduled to be up this cycle, along with 1 additional seat holding a special election to fill an unexpired term: the 34th district, held by appointed Senator Joe McDermott, whose former incumbent Erik Poulsen vacated the seat.

Overview

Composition

Seats up for election

These are the final, official results as taken from the website of the Secretary of State of Washington.

District 1

District 2

District 3

District 4

District 5

District 9

District 10

District 11

District 12

District 14

District 16

District 17

District 18

District 19

District 20

District 22

District 23

District 24

District 25

District 27

District 28

District 34 (special election)

District 39

District 40

District 41
Representative Fred Jarrett switched to the Democratic Party.

District 49

References

2008 Washington (state) elections
Washington State Senate elections
Washington Senate